Telemicro (Spanish: Corporacion de Television y Microondas, English: Television and Microwave Corporation) is a television broadcast channel in the Dominican Republic which is owned by Juan Ramón Gómez Díaz under Grupo de Medios Telemicro. Telemicro has program alliances with Univision and Televisa. In 1986, the slogan was Television Globalizada (Globalized Television) and Se Ve Mejor (It looks good).

History
In July 2016, Olympusat added the international version of the channel to its OTT platform, VEMOX.

References

External links
  

Television stations in the Dominican Republic
Television channels and stations established in 1986
Spanish-language television stations